Hit & Run is a bluegrass band originally from Colorado, now based in Tennessee.

History
Hit & Run formed in Colorado in late 2001 with the mutual desire to play authentic-yet-modern bluegrass. The band has released two studio albums. Hit & Run has toured extensively throughout the United States, playing such prestigious festivals as Telluride Bluegrass Festival, High sierra music festival, Grand Targhee Bluegrass Festival, Grey Fox Bluegrass Festival, Rockygrass Bluegrass Festival, and Bean Blossom.

Hit & Run has shared billing with artists such as Creedence Clearwater Revisited, Jerry Douglas, Hot Rize, Alison Krauss, and David Grisman. In 2005 they took first place in the SPBGMA International Band Championship in Nashville. In 2003, Hit & Run became the first band to win both Telluride (2003) and Rockygrass (2002) Bluegrass Festival Band Contests. Guitarist Rebecca Frazier became the first woman to appear on the cover of Flatpicking Guitar Magazine when the September 2006 issue of that magazine was released.

The group now tours as Rebecca Frazier and Hit & Run Bluegrass. The lineup consists of Rebecca Frazier (née Hoggan) on guitar, Isaac Eicher on mandolin, Mike Sumner on banjo, Erik Alvar on bass, and Nate Leath and Christian Ward sharing fiddle duties.

Successes
 2005 & 2014 International Bluegrass Music Association Showcase Artist
 First place, 2005 SPBGMA International Band Championship Nashville, TN
 First place, 2003 Telluride Bluegrass Festival Band Contest Telluride, CO & Lyons, CO
 First place, 2002 Rockygrass Band Contest Lyons, CO

Sound 

Hit & Run's appeal may be their youthful energy combined with polished vocals, hot picking, and their contemporary sound. They tastefully interpret standard bluegrass and traditional tunes, and they skillfully craft original tunes. As Denver Westword says, their music is:

Members

Original members 
 Rebecca Hoggan – Mandolin, guitar, vocals
 Mike Mickelson – Guitar, mandolin, vocals
 Erin Coats – Upright bass, vocals
 Aaron Younberg – Banjo

Past members 
John Frazier, mandolin
Kyle Tuttle, banjo (2013–2015)
Andy Thorn, banjo (2007–2010)
Lorenzo Gangi, banjo (2006–2007)
Steve Roy, bass (2006–2010)
David Mayfield, bass (2007)
David Richey dobro

Discography
 Beauty Fades (2004)
 Without Maps or Charts (2005)
 Four Finger Music: The Bluegrass Tribute to the Music Made Famous by the Simpsons (2007)

References

External links
 Hit and Run Bluegrass' official site
 Colorado Bluegrass Music Associations Hit and Run Bluegrass page
 Hit and Run Bluegrass at Archive.org
 SPBGMA 2005 Band Contest Winners
 Hit & Run at cdbaby.com

American bluegrass music groups
Musical groups from Colorado